The November 2010 Baghdad bombings occurred on 2 November 2010, when between 57 and 62 people were killed and more than 300 people were wounded after a series of ten bomb explosions in Baghdad, the capital of Iraq. It was reported that explosions occurred in seven neighborhoods, and many of the explosions were car bombs, although at least one was a roadside bomb. 

While reports on the number of dead vary, reports suggest that 62 were killed, although the Interior Ministry confirmed that 57 people were killed overall. An official said: "Ten cars exploded with bombs inside them. There were also four roadside bombs and two sticky bombs."  The majority of the explosions occurred in populated areas, including near restaurants. At least 15 were killed in one attack, in Sadr City.

References

2010 murders in Iraq
21st-century mass murder in Iraq
Mass murder in 2010
Car and truck bombings in Iraq
Terrorist incidents in Iraq in 2010
Terrorist incidents in Baghdad
2010s in Baghdad
Violence against Shia Muslims in Iraq